The Hebrew diacritic  ּ represents:

Dagesh, indicating a modification of the sound of a letter
Mappiq, indicating that the Heh letter (ה) is to be pronounced as a consonant
Shuruk, a niqqud vowel sign representing the sound [u]